Joel Melvin Prpic (born September 25, 1974) is a Canadian-born Croatian former professional ice hockey player of who played in the National Hockey League with the Boston Bruins and the Colorado Avalanche before ending his career with Croatian team, KHL Medveščak Zagreb, in the Austrian Hockey League.

Playing career 
As a towering 6 foot 7 forward for the Waterloo Siskins in the Ontario Minor Hockey Association Prpic was selected in the ninth round, 233rd overall by the Boston Bruins in the 1993 NHL Entry Draft. Opting to pursue an education Prpic was recruited to play collegiate hockey with St. Lawrence University in the ECAC.

After his senior year and developing as one of the biggest forwards in hockey, Joel turned pro in the 1997–98 season with the Bruins AHL affiliate, the Providence Bruins. Scoring an effective 35 points in 73 games as a checking forward, Prpic made his NHL debut in a solitary game with the Bruins, a playoff-clinching win, against the New York Islanders.
Returned to Providence for the following season, it was not until the 1999–2000 season in which Joel played a further 14 games with Boston. He recorded his first point on a Cameron Mann goal and had his first multi-point game with another assist on a goal to Steve Heinze in a 5–4 defeat to the Tampa Bay Lightning on April 4, 2000.

On August 29, 2000, Joel then signed a one-year contract as a free agent with the Colorado Avalanche. He was sent to AHL affiliate, the Hershey Bears, for the majority of the 2000–01 season, but played in three games for the eventual Stanley Cup-winning Avalanche, recording two penalty minutes against the Phoenix Coyotes in a 2–1 victory on November 29, 2000. Prpic left the Avalanche in the off-season and signed a one-year deal with the San Jose Sharks on August 15, 2001.

In the 2001–02 season, Prpic never appeared with the Sharks but led the Sharks affiliate, the Cleveland Barons, with 80 games and scoring a professional high 48 points. Prpic left North America the following season having played in just 18 career games in the NHL, 15 for the Boston Bruins and three for the Colorado Avalanche, before joining Kokudo Keikaku Tokyo of the Asia League in the 2002–03 season. Prpic was one of the first notable players to join the developing Asian league and had held the record as the tallest to ever play in the League until Steve McKenna joined the league for the 2006–07 season. He holds the records for the most penalty minutes in a season by receiving 175 in the 2006–07 season.

After his seventh season with the Prince Rabbits organization in the Asia League, Joel left to sign a one-year deal as a free agent with Croat team, KHL Medveščak, of the Erste Bank Eishockey League on September 10, 2009. In signing with Zagreb, Prpic returned to the roots of his ancestors, with eligibility and ambition to play with the Croatian national team.

In the 2009–10 season, Prpic scored 43 points in a team-leading 54 games. On April 20, 2010, he was re-signed to a two-year contract as Medveščak finished seventh in the league. Prpic expressed desire to end his career with KHL Medveščak. After the completion of the 2011–12 season, and representing Croatia for the first time at the 2012 IIHF World Championship Division II, Prpic opted an end to his professional career and pursue a Firefighting career in Canada. Nonetheless, Prpic played for the Croatian national team at the IIHF World Championship Division II in 2013 as well.

Prpic currently plays for the Brantford Blast of the Ontario Hockey Association's Allan Cup Hockey.

Career statistics

Regular season and playoffs

International

References

External links 

 

1974 births
Boston Bruins draft picks
Boston Bruins players
Canadian emigrants to Croatia
Canadian expatriate ice hockey players in Croatia
Canadian ice hockey centres
Canadian people of Croatian descent
Cleveland Barons (2001–2006) players
Colorado Avalanche players
Croatian ice hockey centres
Hershey Bears players
Ice hockey people from Ontario
KHL Medveščak Zagreb players
Kokudo Keikaku players
Living people
Citizens of Croatia through descent
Providence Bruins players
Sportspeople from Greater Sudbury
St. Lawrence Saints men's ice hockey players